Bernardo Pardo (born February 11, 1932) is a former associate justice of the Supreme Court of the Philippines and a former Comelec Chairman. He was appointed by former Philippine President Joseph Estrada. He was born in Manila, to San Isidro, Nueva Ecija natives, Dr. and Mrs. Leopoldo G. Pardo, and is married to Zenaida C. De Dios, with whom he has 4 children: Lourdes, Bernardita, Mercedes Patricia, and Victor.

Education
He graduated high school at Letran College, with honors, in 1950. He was a graduate of Law from the University of Santo Tomas in 1955, and passed the bar examinations with a bar rating of 81.55%, on March 6, 1956. He was a fellow at the Academy of American and International Law, at the University of Texas, USA in 1978.

Associate Justice
He practiced law, by having been a lawyer in Jose W. Diokno Law Office, 1955–1961. He was Solicitor, in the Office of the Solicitor General, 1971–1974. He was Acting City Judge, Manila, 1965–1967. He was CFI Judge of Caloocan, from 1974 to 1983, RTC Judge of Manila, Br. 43, from 1983 to 1993, and CA Justice from 1993 to 1995. He was promoted Chair of the COMELEC from 1995 until his appointment to the Supreme Court in 1998.

He was appointed by Joseph Estrada on September 30, 1998. He retired on February 11, 2002.

See also
Commission on Elections (Philippines)

References

External links
Supreme Court

1932 births
Colegio de San Juan de Letran alumni
Living people
People from Manila
People from Nueva Ecija
Chairpersons of the Commission on Elections of the Philippines
Ramos administration personnel
Associate Justices of the Supreme Court of the Philippines